is a Japanese goalball player who won a gold medal at the 2012 Summer Paralympics.

Her visual impairment is congenital. She started playing goalball during the first year of junior high school.

References 

Paralympic gold medalists for Japan
Goalball players at the 2012 Summer Paralympics
Sportspeople from Gifu Prefecture
People from Nakatsugawa, Gifu
1990 births
Living people
Medalists at the 2012 Summer Paralympics
Paralympic goalball players of Japan
Female goalball players
Paralympic medalists in goalball
21st-century Japanese women